The Gawdawpalin Temple is a Buddhist temple located in Bagan, Myanmar. Construction of the pagoda began in 1203 during the reign of Sithu II (1174–1211) and completed on 26 March 1227 during the reign of Htilominlo (1211–1235). At , Gawdawpalin Temple is the second tallest temple in Bagan. Similar in layout to the Thatbyinnyu Temple, the temple is two storeys tall, and contains three lower terraces and four upper terraces. The temple was heavily damaged during the 1975 earthquake and was reconstructed in following years.

The Gawdawpalin Temple belongs to the style of the hollow gu-style temple. In contrast to the stupas, the hollow gu-style temple is a structure used for meditation, devotional worship of Lord Buddha and conduct other Buddhist rituals. The gu temples come in two basic styles: "one-face" design and "four-face" design—essentially one main entrance and four main entrances. Other styles such as five-face and hybrids also exist. The one-face style grew out of 2nd century Beikthano, and the four-face out of 7th century Sri Ksetra. The temples, whose main features were the pointed arches and the vaulted chamber, became larger and grander in the Bagan period. (Paragraph on "Hollow Temples" copied from Bagan).

Notes

References
 
  
 
 
 

Buddhist temples in Myanmar
Religious buildings and structures completed in 1227
Bagan
13th-century Buddhist temples